Nikolay Andreevich Suslov (born September 8, 1969 in Leningrad, USSR), is a Russian film producer and writer.
Graduated from Moscow State Institute of International Relations of Ministry of Foreign Affairs,
Doctor of Law, 1992).

Since 1998 he is a film producer and CEO/owner of Svarog Films company.

Film credits 
Empire under Strike (Империя по ударом), – Producer.
Spetznaz, (Спецназ) – Producer, Writer.
Russian Spetznaz, (Русский Спецназ) – Producer, Writer, Stunts Supervisor.
Spetznaz-2, (Спецназ-2) – Producer, Writer.
Russian Spetznaz-2, (Спецназ по-русски – 2)- Producer, Writer, Stunts Supervisor.
Golden Meduza, (Золотая медуза) – Producer, Writer.
Polumgla, (Полумгла) – VFX Producer.
The SUN, (Солнце) – VFX Producer.
Elegy of Life. Rostropovich, Vishnevskaya., – Co-Producer.
1812, – Producer, writer, Stunt Supervisor.
Red Sky – Producer, Writer.

Awards 
TEFI – Russian National TV award, Best TV film nomination, 2001
International stunt festival "PROMETHEUS", Best stunt film of the year, 2002
Golden Eagle Award – Russian National cinema award, Best film of the year, 2003
TEFI – Russian National TV award, Best TV film nomination, 2003
"LAW & SOCIETY" – International film festival, First Prise, 2003
"PIXEL" – National VFX and computer arts festival, Best film computer graphics and VFX, 2003
"PIXEL" – National VFX and computer arts festival, Audience sympathy prise, 2003
«LAW & SOCIETY» – International film festival, First Prise, 2004
International stunt festival "PROMETHEUS", Best stunt film of the year, 2004

References

External links 

Russian film producers
1969 births
Living people